The 2013 Nordic Opening was the 4th edition of the annual cross-country skiing event. The three-day event was the first competition round of the 2013–14 FIS Cross-Country World Cup.

World Cup points distribution 
The winners of the overall standings were awarded 200 World Cup points and the winners of each of the three stages were awarded 50 World Cup points.

A total of 350 points was possible to achieve if one athlete won all three stages and the overall standings.

Overall standings

Overall leadership by stage

Men

Women

References

External links 
 Nordic Opening home page
 2013–14 World Cup Calendar

2013–14 FIS Cross-Country World Cup
2013
2013 in cross-country skiing
November 2013 sports events in Europe
December 2013 sports events in Europe